The Book of Alternative Services (BAS) is the contemporary, inclusive-language liturgical book used in place of the 1962 Book of Common Prayer (BCP) in most parishes of the Anglican Church of Canada.

Further reading
 Webster, John, et al. Anglicans Share Their Views [about] Using the Book of Alternative Services: the Report of a Survey Conducted for the Book of Alternative Services Commission, September 1993. Toronto, Ont.: Anglican Book Centre, 1993. N.B.: On verso of t.p.: "Prepared ... by Canadian Facts, Toronto, Ontario."

External links
Book of Alternative Services (PDF)
Book of Alternative Services (HTML)
Portions of the Book of Alternative Services in English and French

Anglican Church of Canada
Book of Common Prayer
1985 non-fiction books
Christian prayer books
Anglican liturgical books